Colonel Thomas Handasyd Perkins, also known as T. H. Perkins (December 15, 1764 – January 11, 1854), was an American merchant, slave trader, smuggler and philanthropist from a wealthy Boston Brahmin family. Starting with bequests from his grandfather and father-in-law, he amassed a huge fortune. As a young man, he traded slaves in Saint-Domingue, worked as a maritime fur trader trading furs from the American Northwest to China, and then turned to smuggling Turkish opium into China. His philanthropic contributions include the Perkins School for the Blind, renamed in his honor; the Boston Museum of Fine Arts; McLean Hospital; along with having a hand in founding the Massachusetts General Hospital.

Early life
Perkins was born on December 15, 1764, in Boston, Massachusetts.  His parents, James Perkins and Elizabeth Peck, had ten children in eighteen years. His nephew John Perkins Cushing was active in Perkins' China business for 30 years; the town of Belmont, Massachusetts, is named for his estate. His great-nephew Charles Callahan Perkins became a well known artist, author and philanthropist like his grandfather James Perkins.

When Perkins was twelve, he was in the crowd which first heard the Declaration of Independence read to the citizens of Boston. The family had planned to send Perkins to Harvard College, but he had no interest in a college education.

Career
In 1779, he began working, and in 1785, when he turned 21, he became legally entitled to a small bequest that had been left to him by his grandfather, Thomas Handasyd Peck, a Boston merchant who dealt largely in furs and hats.  Until 1793, Perkins engaged in the slave trade at Cap-Haïtien Haiti.

In 1785, when China opened the port of Canton to foreign businesses, Perkins became one of the first Boston merchants to engage in the China trade. He sailed as supercargo on the Astrea, captain James Magee, owned by Elias Hasket Derby, to Canton in 1789 with a cargo including ginseng, cheese, lard, wine, and iron.  On the trip back it carried tea and silk cloth.  In 1815, Perkins and his brother James opened a Mediterranean office to buy Turkish opium for resale in China.

Perkins was also a major industrial investor within Massachusetts. He owned the Granite Railway, the first commercial American railroad, which was built to carry granite from Quincy quarries to Charlestown for construction of the Bunker Hill Monument and other city buildings in Boston. He also held significant holdings in the Elliot textile mills in Newton, the mills at Holyoke and Lowell, New England canals and railroads, and lead and iron mines including the Monkton Iron Company in Vergennes, Vermont. In addition, Perkins was politically active in the Federalist Party, serving terms as state senator and representative from 1805–1817.  Additionally, he invested in many of the mills on Lowell, MA including Appleton Mills.

Philanthropy
In later years Perkins became a philanthropist. In 1826, he and his brother, James Perkins, contributed half the sum of $30,000 that was needed for an addition to the Boston Athenaeum, and the old Boston Athenaeum Gallery of Art was moved to James Perkins's home. The Perkins School for the Blind, still in existence in Watertown, Massachusetts, was renamed in his honor after he donated his Boston mansion to the financially troubled "Massachusetts Asylum for the Blind" in 1832. He was also a major benefactor to the Boston Museum of Fine Arts, McLean Hospital, and helped to found the Massachusetts General Hospital.

Gloucester Sea Serpent

Thomas Perkins was also involved in the 1817 Gloucester sea serpent sightings in Gloucester Harbor, an event whose academic legacy would not be felt until the old age of his great-grandson Godfrey Lowell Cabot. Throughout the summer of 1817, a sea serpent was reportedly seen by hundreds of people, including the crews of four whaling boats. Described as "a sixty-foot-long creature" by coastal vessel captain Parson Bentley, a skeptical Colonel Perkins decided to attempt to observe it himself.

Perkins' published report of his experience became part of his family's lore and, two years later in 1819 his daughter and son-in-law Eliza and Samuel Cabot Jr. were among the many who reported sighting a sea serpent off the coast of Nahant This news caused a "sea serpent mania" along the coast of Massachusetts but, most importantly, it sparked an interest in such fabled creatures in Eliza and Samuel Cabot Jr.'s grandson Godfrey Lowell Cabot. While in his nineties, Godfrey Cabot sponsored the restoration of the Harvard Museum of Comparative Zoology's (MCZ) complete Kronosaurus skeleton. Having again been interested in sea serpents since childhood and thus often questioning MCZ director Alfred Romer about the existence and reports of sea serpents, it thus occurred to Dr. Romer to tell Mr. Cabot about the unexcavated Kronosaurus skeleton in the museum closet. Godfrey Cabot then asked how much a restoration would cost and "Romer, pulling a figure out of the musty air, replied, 'Oh, about $10,000.'" Romer may not have been serious but the philanthropist clearly was because the check for said sum came shortly thereafter.

Personal life
On March 25, 1788, Perkins married Sarah "Sally" Elliott (1768–1852) in Boston, Massachusetts. Together, they had the following children:

 Elizabeth Perkins (1791–1885), who married Samuel Cabot Jr. (1784–1863).
 Sarah Eliot Perkins (1793–1856)
 Col. Thomas Handasyd Perkins, Jr. (1796–1850), who was known as "Short-arm Tom" and who married Jane Frances Rebecca Dumaresq (1799–1856), the "famous beauty of Kennebec."
 Mary Ann Cushing Perkins (1798–1880), who married Thomas Graves Cary (1791–1859).
 Caroline Perkins (1800–1867), who married William Howard Gardiner (1797–1880), son of Bishop John Sylvester John Gardiner.
 Nancy Cushing Perkins (1806–1889), who married William Ferdinand Cary (1796–1881).

Upon retirement, Perkins built a summer home on Swan Island in the Kennebec River near Richmond, Maine. He helped the island achieve independent municipal status by paying legal fees for its charter and the town was renamed Perkins in gratitude. It is now Perkins Township, a ghost town.

Colonel Perkins died on January 11, 1854, in Brookline, Massachusetts, and is buried in the family plot at Mount Auburn Cemetery.

Descendants
Through his son, he was the grandfather of Louisa Perkins, who married prominent Boston painter William Morris Hunt.

Through his daughter Elizabeth, he was the grandfather of seven grandsons, including Edward Clarke Cabot (b. 1818), an architect and artist, James Elliot Cabot (b. 1821), a philosopher and author, and Samuel Cabot III, a surgeon and ornithologist.

Through his daughter Mary Ann, he was the grandfather of Mary Cary, who married Harvard Professor Cornelius Conway Felton (later president of Harvard University), and Elizabeth Cabot Cary (1822–1907), the co-founder and first president of Radcliffe College, who married Louis Agassiz (1807–1873), a Swiss-American biologist and geologist.

Through his daughter Caroline, he was the grandfather of William Prescott Gardiner (1824–1860), Edward Gardiner (1825–1859), a co-founder of the American Society of Civil Engineers and Architects and the American Institute of Architects, Mary Cary Gardiner (1827–1863), John Sylvester Gardiner (1830–1856), Caroline Louisa Gardiner (1832–1888), and Charles Perkins Gardiner (1836–1864).

References 
Notes

Sources
 
 Carl Seaburg and Stanley Paterson, Merchant Prince of Boston. Colonel T.H. Perkins, 1764–1854, 1971.
 
 Perkins and Company, Canton 1803–1827. Bulletin of the Business Historical Society, Vol. 6, No. 2 (Mar., 1932). .

External links
 Massachusetts Historical Society Thomas Handasyd Perkins papers, 1783-1892 guide
 Portrait of James Perkins, brother of T.H. Perkins

1764 births
1854 deaths
19th-century American railroad executives
American philanthropists
Businesspeople from Boston
People from Brookline, Massachusetts
American expatriates in China
People from Sagadahoc County, Maine
Drug dealers
McLean Hospital people
18th-century American businesspeople
American slave traders